Boetie Britz (born 28 July 1987) is a South African rugby union player, who can play as a loose-forward or a hooker.

In 2009 and 2010, he played for Maties in the FNB Varsity Cup, helping them to two championships.

He was named in the  wider training squad for the 2013 Super Rugby season, but was subsequently released to the Vodacom Cup squad.

References

1987 births
Living people
People from Mossel Bay
South African rugby union players
Eastern Province Elephants players
Western Province (rugby union) players
Rugby union flankers
Rugby union players from the Western Cape